Scopula regenerata is a moth of the family Geometridae. It is found in the West Indies.

References

Moths described in 1794
regenerata
Moths of the Caribbean